Viale may refer to:

People
 Fabio Viale (born 1975), Italian sculptor
 Giovanna Viale (born 1949), Italian geneticist
 Jean-Louis Viale (1933–1984), French jazz drummer
 Juan Manuel Viale (born 1981), Argentinian football player
 Julien Viale (born 1982), French football player
 Luigi Viale (born 1978), Italian yacht racer
 Michele Viale-Prelà (1798–1860), French priest and diplomat
 Raimondo Viale (1907–1984), Italian priest
 Robert M. Viale (1916–1945), American army officer
 Spirito Mario Viale (born 1882), Italian engineer

Places
 Viale, Entre Ríos, Argentina
 Viale, Piedmont, Asti, Italy
 Viale is Italian for boulevard. Some notable roads whose names use that word include:
 Viale Aventino, Rome, Italy
 Viale Enrico Forlanini, Milan, Italy
 Viale Lazio, Palermo, Italy, location of the Viale Lazio massacre
 Viale Luigi Borri, Varese, Italy
 Viale Luigi Majno, Milan, Italy
 Viale Pasubio, Milan, Italy

Other
 Viale 35 hp, five-cylinder, air-cooled, radial engine for aircraft use